TRANSRADIO SenderSysteme Berlin AG was a German radio communication systems producer, specialised in research, development and design of AM, VHF/FM and DRM such as military and commercial broadcasting systems. Intermediate they were a subsidiary of swiss AMPEGON AG and today an affiliate company of CESTRON International GmbH named Elsyscom GmbH.

History
The name Transradio dates back to 1918 when Transradio was founded as a subsidiary of Telefunken. In 1919, TRANSRADIO-Aktiengesellschaft für drahtlosen Überseeverkehr was the first company mentioned to introduce duplex radio transmission worldwide. 
The since 1989 existing company Telefunken Sendertechnik GmbH was renamed in 2000 to Telefunken SenderSysteme Berlin AG. Five years later the company became TRANSRADIO SenderSysteme Berlin AG. The nominal capital of 1.5 Mio € in 2010 was increased to 1.87 Mio €. After massive losses since 2007 and in spite of further credits of 1.8 Mio € from her majority shareholder Bevita Commercial Corp.(Vaduz), TRANSRADIO filed for insolvency on 1st August 2017 due to overextension and inability to pay.

Chances
The Swiss company AMPEGON AG immediate acquired the product lines TRAM and SICAMP with their proper production, the inventory and a qualified team of technicians from the insolvent estate. From that they built AM Broadcast GmbH, a new subsidiary of AMPEGON. With this AMPEGON intended to restart its own production of medium-wave emitters and took over service for former clients of TRANSRADIO Sendersysteme Berlin AG following the former cooperation with TRANSRADIO. A little later the registered business address is changed to Berlin. After the completion of insolvency resolution TRANSRADIO SenderSysteme Berlin AG should become a member of the AMPEGON AG.
Against expectation, in October 2019 an announcement was made by AMPEGON whereby since 2012 the decision existed, to sell off the production of broadcasting equipment. Only some unexpected issues prevented to decide before long. 
Just before, in September 2019 the new investor CESTRON International GmbH acquired AM Broadcast together with Ampegon Antenna Systems (former Thales Group, who produced the ALLISS-Antennas) and built up the new company Elsyscom GmbH at Teltow near Berlin. With this the old TRANSRADIO Sendersysteme Berlin together with the well known AMPEGON Antenna Systems became the new company Elsyscom GmbH as manufacturer of modern transmitters.

Engagement in DRM
TRANSRADIO SenderSysteme Berlin AG was a promoter and supporter of digitizing AM-driven emitters to DRM-mode. Nearly all greater medium- and longwave-emitters were equipped with their "TRAM"-models. So operation mode of these emitters could be switched either to AM or to DRM. Nevertheless not only the emitters of Deutschlandradio were switched off in the years 2014/15 but also nearly all foreign radio-services decided to finish their emissions on short- and medium waves. The intermediate owner AMPEGON AG was founder of the DRM-Standard and active leading force in the DRM consortium for the definition of the DRM. After the acquisition of the emitter-models TRAM from TRANSRADIO, it looked like AMPEGON would offer DRM-capable radio transmitters produced by the company itself. In fact since 2012 there existed considerations to sell off the business concerning short- and mediumwave- transmitters. Only some issues with unfinished projects prevented to decide for long.

References 

Electronics companies of Germany
Technology companies of Germany
Manufacturing companies based in Berlin
Electronics companies established in 2005
Technology companies established in 2005
2005 establishments in Germany